James William Marshall (March 31, 1844 – November 27, 1911) served as a member of the United States House of Representatives from Virginia.

Biography
Marshall was born near Staunton, Virginia, in Augusta County.

He served during the Civil War in the Confederate Army as a private for four years.

After the War, he graduated in 1870 from Roanoke College in Salem, Virginia. He studied law and was admitted to the bar, serving Commonwealth's attorney for Craig County, Virginia in the years 1870–1875 and 1884–1888.

Marshall served in the Senate of Virginia during the years 1875–1878 and 1891–1892, and was a member of the Virginia House of Delegates in 1883 and 1884.

Marshall elected as a Democrat to the Fifty-third Congress (March 4, 1893 – March 3, 1895). He was an unsuccessful candidate for renomination in 1894. He resumed the practice of law in Newcastle, Virginia. He was a delegate to the Virginia Constitutional Convention of 1901-1902.

He died in Newcastle, and was interred in West View Cemetery.

References

This article is from the public domain Bioguide of the US Congress. Check the link to view the original source.
Source:

Notes

1844 births
1911 deaths
County and city Commonwealth's Attorneys in Virginia
Democratic Party members of the Virginia House of Delegates
Roanoke College alumni
Democratic Party Virginia state senators
Delegates to Virginia Constitutional Convention of 1901
20th-century American politicians
Democratic Party members of the United States House of Representatives from Virginia
People from Augusta County, Virginia
19th-century American politicians
People from Craig County, Virginia